Vincent Frederick Rickey (born 17 December 1941) is an American logician and historian of mathematics.

Rickey received his B.S. (1963), M.S. (1966), and Ph.D. (1968) from the University of Notre Dame in South Bend, Indiana. His Ph.D. was entitled An Axiomatic Theory of Syntax. He joined the academic staff of Ohio's Bowling Green State University in 1968, became there a full professor in 1979, and retired there in 1998. He was then a mathematics professor at the United States Military Academy from 1998 until his retirement in 2011. He was a visiting professor at the University of Notre Dame (1971–1972), Indiana University at South Bend (1977–1978), the University of Vermont (1984–1985), and the United States Military Academy (1989–1990). He was a Visiting Mathematician (1994–1995) at the Mathematical Association of America (MAA) headquarters in Washington, D.C. and while on this sabbatical he was involved in the founding of the undergraduate magazine Math Horizons.

He is an expert on the logical systems of Stanisław Leśniewski and has been a member of the editorial boards of the Notre Dame Journal of Formal Logic and The Philosopher's Index. Rickey has broad interests in the history of mathematics with a particular interest in the historical development of calculus and the use of this history to motivate and inspire students.

He is a multiple awardee. He got the first statewide Distinguished Teaching Award from the Ohio section of the MAA, one of the first national MAA awards for Distinguished Teaching, four times the Kappa Mu Epsilon honorary society award for Excellence in Teaching Mathematics (1991, 1988, 1975, 1971), and the Outstanding Civilian Service Medal from the Department of the Army in 1990 for performance while serving as the visiting professor of mathematics at the United States Military Academy.

Selected publications
with Joe Albree & David C. Arney: 
 (See Introductio in analysin infinitorum.)

with Shawnee McMurran:  
with Amy Shell-Gellasch: “Mathematics Education at West Point: The First Hundred Years–Teaching at the Academy”. Convergence. July 2010.
with Michael Huber: “What is 0^0?” Convergence. July 2012.
with Theodore Crackel and Joel S. Silverberg:

References

External links
Dürer’s Magic Square, Cardano’s Rings, Prince Rupert’s Cube, and Other Neat Things, presentation by V. F. Rickey,  MAA Short Course "Recreational Mathematics", Albuquerque, New Mexico, 2–3 August 2005

1941 births
Living people
20th-century American mathematicians
21st-century American mathematicians
American historians of mathematics
University of Notre Dame alumni
Bowling Green State University faculty
United States Military Academy faculty